Dušan Stoiljković (born 5 September 1994) is a Serbian football player who plays as a left winger at Radnički Kragujevac.

References

External links
PrvaLiga profile 

1994 births
Living people
Sportspeople from Sombor
Serbian footballers
Association football wingers
Serbian expatriate footballers
Serbian expatriate sportspeople in Slovenia
Expatriate footballers in Slovenia
Serbian expatriate sportspeople in Montenegro
Expatriate footballers in Montenegro
RFK Novi Sad 1921 players
NK Radomlje players
FK Inđija players
FK Budućnost Podgorica players
FK TSC Bačka Topola players
Serbian First League players
Slovenian Second League players
Slovenian PrvaLiga players
Montenegrin First League players